Caimanera is a municipality and town in Guantánamo Province on the south eastern coast of Cuba. It is a fishing village and port built on the West shore of the sheltered Guantánamo Bay, just north of the US naval base and south of the provincial capital, Guantánamo.

History

The town was named for the caiman alligators which were once common in the river and in the mangrove labyrinths of the upper Bay, but which have since declined in numbers.

The community of fishermen and salt mine workers flourished at the beginning of the 20th century precisely because of the base's construction. It was a magnet for Cuban workers and a popular spot for visitors, including Cubans from across the island and people from nearby countries such as Jamaica.

Caimanera was liberated on December 19, 1958. On this anniversary the town usually has a parade and a political action.

The Havana Times reports that in 1959, not long after the Cuban Revolution drove out the pro-American Battista administration, two US Navy tugboats came to Caimanera to apply their powerful water-cannons to put out a raging fire that destroyed three city blocks.

The Cuban Revolution of 1959 marked strained relations between Cuba and America, in general, and specifically between the inhabitants of Caimanera and the nearby Guantanamo Bay Naval Base.  
Prior to the revolution off-duty US personnel from the base were free to visit Caimanera, and the town was home to many bars and bordellos, that catered to them.  The base employed over three thousand Cuban workers.  Cuban contractors, who employed the workers, whisked them to their jobs on the base in speed-boats.

After the revolution, both sides made policy changes.  
Cuba allowed workers to continue to work on the base, but they had to walk to the remote North-East Gate.  The USA would continue to employ those Cubans who already had jobs, but would not hire any new Cuban workers.  The number of Cuban workers dwindled, with the last two retiring in 2012.

Geography
Caimanera borders with the municipalities of Niceto Pérez, Guantánamo, Manuel Tames and San Antonio del Sur. Its territory includes the villages of Boquerón (also known as "Mártires de la Frontera"), Cayamo and Mata Abajo.

Residents of this town are the closest Cuban neighbours to the US naval base. The North East Gate, located near Boquerón, is the only US-Cuban border crossing point. Due to its proximity to the US Base, Caimanera is a forbidden town, needing a special permission from the government to visit it.

Caimanera is within range of the T-Mobile towers at the naval base and so is the only town in Cuba with American cellphone and Internet service. Residents can get 4G service.

Demographics
In 2004, the municipality of Caimanera had a population of 10,562.

Economy
Ships chiefly export sugarcane and coffee.

Transport
Linked to Guantánamo by the "Carretera a Caimanera" road, the municipal territory of Caimanera is located close to the  "Carretera Central". The town counts also a terminal station on a minor railway line to Guantánamo.

Gallery

See also
Guantánamo Bay
List of cities in Cuba
Municipalities of Cuba

References

External links

 Caimanera on EcuRed

Populated places in Guantánamo Province
Port cities and towns in Cuba
Guantanamo Bay
Port cities in the Caribbean